Great Scott is an opera composed in 2015, with music written by Jake Heggie to a libretto by Terrence McNally. This was the duo's first, full-length opera since the premiere of Dead Man Walking in 2000. It was one of three works commissioned by the Dallas Opera in 2015.

In a production starring mezzo-soprano Joyce DiDonato, Great Scott premiered at the Winspear Opera House in Dallas, Texas, on October 30, 2015.

A West Coast premiere of Great Scott by the San Diego Opera opened on May 7, 2016.

Roles

References

External links
 Cincinnati Opera workshop on Great Scott in November, 2014

Operas by Jake Heggie
Libretti by Terrence McNally
English-language operas
Operas set in the United States
2015 operas
Operas